The Ilok–Bačka Palanka Bridge or the 25 May Bridge crosses the Danube at its 1297th kilometer, connecting the towns of Ilok, Croatia and Bačka Palanka, Serbia. It is the 825 meters long single-carriageway road bridge, built as a box girder construction. It was opened in 1974 as the "25 May" Bridge, named after the birthday of Yugoslav leader Josip Broz Tito. The bridge was damaged by airplane bombs during the NATO bombing of Yugoslavia on 4 April 1999. After reconstruction, it was opened for truck and bus traffic on 30 April 2002.

The bridge is a border crossing itself, and there is an additional land crossing nearby, towards the village of Neštin in the west. It is the terminal point of the Croatian D2 road and a part of Serbian road M18.

See also
 List of bridges in Serbia
 List of crossings of the Danube

References

External links
 Closeup photo of the bridge

Bridges over the Danube
Bridges in Croatia
Road bridges in Serbia
Bridges completed in 1974
Croatia–Serbia border crossings
Ilok
Buildings and structures in Vukovar-Syrmia County
Bačka Palanka